Laron Scott (born July 12, 1987) is an American football cornerback who is currently a free agent. He began his pro career as an undrafted free agent with the New York Giants.

Professional career

New York Giants
Scott signed a one-year, $2.99 million contract with the Giants on August 16, 2012. On August 11, 2012, he made his preseason debut against the New England Patriots and made his first NFL interception in the fourth quarter with 16 seconds to go. On August 25, 2013, he was waived by the Giants and subsequently placed on season-ending injured reserve.

Los Angeles KISS
Scott was assigned to the Los Angeles KISS of the Arena Football League on March 5, 2015. On November 4, 2015, the KISS picked up Scott's rookie option for 2016.

References

1987 births
Living people
American football cornerbacks
Georgia Southern Eagles football players
New York Giants players
Los Angeles Kiss players
People from Warner Robins, Georgia
Players of American football from Georgia (U.S. state)